"We've Got Love" is a 1978 ballad by R&B vocal duo Peaches & Herb.  It was the third of three single releases from their LP, 2 Hot.

Chart history
The song became a hit during the summer of 1979 in the U.S., narrowly missing the Top 40. It was also an R&B and Adult Contemporary hit. "We've Got Love" did best in the Netherlands, where it reached number 14.

References

External links
 Lyrics of this song
 

1979 singles
1979 songs
Peaches & Herb songs
Male–female vocal duets
Songs written by Freddie Perren
Songs written by Dino Fekaris
Polydor Records singles
Rhythm and blues ballads